The Biblioteca Civica Centrale of Turin, Italy, is a public library established in 1869. It belongs to the  library system. Among its collections are manuscripts produced by Vincenzo Gioberti.

References

The facade of the Central Civic Library of Turin in 1929. Side towards Corso Palestro and Via Bertrandi
This article incorporates information from the Italian Wikipedia.

Bibliography
in English
 

 

in Italian

External links

 Official site 

Libraries in Turin
Turin
1869 establishments in Italy
Libraries established in 1869